Oak Street/Southwest 1st Avenue is a light rail station on the MAX Blue and Red Lines in Portland, Oregon. It the 4th stop on the current Eastside MAX. It was previously also served by the Yellow Line, from 2004 to 2009, until that line's relocation to the Portland Transit Mall.

The station has side platforms built into the sidewalk. Located on 1st Avenue and spanning the block from Oak Street to Stark Street, it serves office buildings and art galleries, as well as Tom McCall Waterfront Park.

Bus line connections
This station on Southwest Oak Street is served by the following bus line:
16-Front Ave/St Helens Rd (one direction only) (stop ID number 12798)

External links

Station info

MAX Light Rail stations
MAX Blue Line
MAX Red Line
Railway stations in the United States opened in 1986
1986 establishments in Oregon
Railway stations in Portland, Oregon